Masahiko Ida (born 25 July 1961) is a Japanese racing driver currently competing in the TCR Asia Series. He previously competed in the Audi R8 LMS Cup.

Racing career
Ida began his career in 2013 in the Audi R8 LMS Cup. He has also raced in the Super GT championship. In September 2015 it was announced that he would race in the first ever TCR Asia Series round in Sepang, driving a SEAT León Cup Racer for Roadstar Racing.

References

External links
 

1961 births
Living people
Asian Formula Renault Challenge drivers
TCR Asia Series drivers
Japanese racing drivers